Mikhail Tikhonovich Tikhanov (Михаил Тихонович Тиханов; 1789–1862) was a Russian artist who accompanied Captain Vasily Golovnin's circumnavigation aboard the frigate Kamchatka.

Biography
Born a serf in 1789, Tikhanov showed artistic talent at the age of seventeen and was sent by his master Prince Galitzine to the Imperial Academy of Arts in Saint Petersburg. Freed in 1815, he worked at the Academy before being recommended by Alexey Olenin for the post of an expeditionary artist for Captain Vasily Golovnin and the expedition of the Kamchatka around the world.

During the voyage from 1817 to 1819, Tikhanov painted at least 43 different pictures of important figures and scenes from Russian North America, Alaska, California and Hawaii. He specialized in human portraits and painted figures including Hawaiian notables King Kamehameha I and High Chief Boki, as well as Russian colonial governor Alexander Andreyevich Baranov. Hawaiian scholar David W. Forbes stated his works done in Hawaii were "among the most mysterious, haunting portrayals of Pacific Islanders ever created". His paintings done in Northern California, including one of a man named Balthazar, are the only known depictions of Bodega Bay Coast Miwok.

Illness and death
On the voyage home in 1818, Tikhanov became seriously ill while the Kamchatka was in Manila in the Philippines. Afterward, he started showing signs of mental illness and was placed in a hospital in Saint Petersburg. Despite a brief period where he showed signs of improvement, he relapsed and never recovered his sanity or worked again. He lived off a disability stipend for the rest of his life. From 1824 until his death in 1862, he spent the remainder of his life in the care of a widow of one of his colleagues. Although some of his works were later published by Captain Golovnin in his account of the expedition, most of his works were never published in his lifetime. His works are now in the Museum of the Russian Academy of Arts in Saint Petersburg.

Gallery

References

19th-century painters from the Russian Empire
Russian male painters
1789 births
1862 deaths
Russian serfs
Russian explorers of the Pacific
19th-century male artists from the Russian Empire